KOPO-LP (88.9 FM) is a radio station licensed to Paia, Hawaii, in the United States. The station, serving the Maui area, is owned by Paia Youth Council Inc.

History
The station was assigned the call letters KEKI-LP on February 3, 2005. On July 7, 2005, the station changed its call sign to KOPO-LP.

See also
List of community radio stations in the United States

References

External links
 

OPO-LP
OPO-LP
Community radio stations in the United States